Poilannammia is a genus of flowering plants belonging to the family Melastomataceae.

It is native to Vietnam.

The genus name of Poilannammia is in honour of Eugène Poilane (1888–1964), a French plant collector at the botanical institute in present-day Ho Chi Minh City, Vietnam. He also worked in the forest service. It was first described and published in Bull. Mus. Natl. Hist. Nat., B, Adansonia, séries 4, Vol.9 on page 263 in 1988.

Known species
According to Kew:
Poilannammia allomorphioidea 
Poilannammia costata 
Poilannammia incisa 
Poilannammia trimera

References

Melastomataceae
Melastomataceae genera
Plants described in 1988
Flora of Vietnam